The 2012–13 Kentucky Wildcats women's basketball team represented the University of Kentucky in the 2012–13 NCAA Division I women's basketball season. The Wildcats, coached by Matthew Mitchell, are a member of the Southeastern Conference, and play their home games on campus at Memorial Coliseum—unlike UK's famous men's program, which plays off-campus at Rupp Arena in downtown Lexington.

Pre-season outlook
The Wildcats returned four starters, including 2012 SEC Player of the Year A'dia Mathies and SEC Freshman of the Year Bria Goss, from a team that finished 28–7 and won their second regular-season Southeastern Conference title in school history, their first since 1981–82. Jennifer O'Neil also returned after sitting out the 2011–12 season with a knee injury, and Kentucky added DeNesha Stallworth (transfer from California), Jelleah Sidney (transfer from Chipola Junior College), and Janee Thompson (McDonald's All-American from Whitney Young High School). The Wildcats were ranked 6th in the Associated Press Preseason Poll, the highest preseason ranking in school history. The SEC coaches also picked Kentucky as the preseason favorite to win the 2012–13 conference title and named A'dia Mathies preseason player of the year.

Recruiting

2012–13 roster
From the official UK women's basketball site :

2012–13 schedule

|-
!colspan=9 style="background:#273BE2; color:#FFFFFF;"| Exhibition

|-
!colspan=9 style="background:#273BE2; color:#FFFFFF;"| Non-conference regular season

|-
!colspan=9 style="background:#273BE2; color:#FFFFFF;"| SEC tournament

|-
!colspan=9 style="background:#273BE2; color:#FFFFFF;"|2013 NCAA tournament

Player stats

Regular season notes
 Bernisha Pinkett finished with career highs of 21 points, 10 rebounds and 5 assists against Miami (OH) on November 28.
 UK set new single-game attendance record of 18,488 vs. DePaul on December 7 in Rupp Arena. The previous record was 14,508 on December 8, 2011 vs. Duke.
 DeNesha Stallworth was named SEC Player of the Week on December 10.
 Kentucky defeated Mississippi State, 100–47, on January 17. The 53-point margin of victory is the largest against an SEC opponent in school history.
 DeNesha Stallworth scored a career-high 25 points in 24 minutes against Mississippi State 
 A'dia Mathies was named SEC Player of the Week on January 21.
 Kentucky won a school record 17 straight games from November 17 to January 24.
 Kentucky set a school record with a 34-game home winning streak.

References

Kentucky Wildcats women's basketball seasons
Kentucky
Kentucky
Kentucky Wild
Kentucky Wild